Fittja metro station is a station on the red line of the Stockholm metro, located in Fittja, Botkyrka Municipality, Sweden. The outdoor station was opened on 1 October 1972 as the south-western terminus of the extension from Vårberg. On 12 January 1975 the line was extended further to Norsborg.

The station has a copy of the Carl Fredrik Reuterswärd bronze sculpture Non-Violence, the original of which was made in memory of John Lennon. Under the canopy roof of the entrance to Fittja center hangs two light sculptures of opal-colored plastic created by Eva Rosengren.

References

External links

Red line (Stockholm metro) stations
Railway stations opened in 1972